A plasticolous lichenized fungi is a lichen which grows on plastic surfaces. This behaviour was first observed in 1994 when foliicolous lichens were found growing on plastic tape but they have since been observed growing on artificial plastic leaves, plastic signs and nylon nets.

References 

Lichenology